Nelson W. Diebel (born November 9, 1970) is an American former competition swimmer, Olympic champion, and former world record-holder.

Diebel won two gold medals at the 1992 Summer Olympics in Barcelona, Spain.  First, he won the men's 100-meter breaststroke, setting a new Olympic record of 1:01.50 in the event final.  Afterward, he swam the breaststroke leg for the winning U.S. team in the men's 4×100-meter medley relay, together with fellow Americans Jeff Rouse (backstroke), Pablo Morales (butterfly) and Jon Olsen (freestyle).  In the event final, the four Americans matched the world record of 3:36.93 set by the U.S. team at the 1988 Summer Olympics.

Diebel attended the Peddie School in Hightstown, New Jersey.  He enrolled in Princeton University, where he swam for the Princeton Tigers swim team under coach C. Rob Orr.

See also
 List of multiple Olympic gold medalists at a single Games
 List of Olympic medalists in swimming (men)
 List of Princeton University Olympians
 List of Princeton University people
 World record progression 4 × 100 metres medley relay

References

External links
 

1970 births
Living people
American male breaststroke swimmers
American swimming coaches
World record setters in swimming
Olympic gold medalists for the United States in swimming
Peddie School alumni
Princeton Tigers men's swimmers
Swimmers from Chicago
Swimmers at the 1991 Pan American Games
Swimmers at the 1992 Summer Olympics
Medalists at the 1992 Summer Olympics
Pan American Games silver medalists for the United States
Pan American Games medalists in swimming
Medalists at the 1991 Pan American Games